Postcards from Heaven is the second studio album by English music duo Lighthouse Family. It was released on 20 October 1997 on Wildcard / Polydor Records. The album produced three Top 10 hits ("Raincloud", "High" and "Lost in Space") and two Top 30 hits ("Question of Faith" and "Postcard from Heaven").

Track listing

Personnel
Tunde Baiyewu - vocals
Craig Ross, Graham Kearns, Phil Hudson - guitar
Jack Daley - bass
Peter Gordeno - organ, Rhodes piano
Paul Tucker - keyboards
Pete Wingfield - piano
Ben Hillier, Rupert Brown - drums
Danny Cummings, Luís Jardim - percussion
Phil Todd - flute, brass
Lain Gray, Lawrence Johnson, Mint Juleps, Tee Green - backing vocals
The London Session Orchestra - strings
Nick Ingman - string arrangements

Charts

Weekly charts

Year-end charts

Certifications and sales

References

1997 albums
Lighthouse Family albums
Polydor Records albums
Albums produced by Mike Peden